Arjun is a 2008 Indian Kannada-language action film directed by Shahuraj Shindhe and starring Darshan, Meera Chopra, and Anant Nag. Darshan plays a cop again after Ayya and Swami.

Cast 

 Darshan as Arjun
 Meera Chopra as Kodan Rama's daughter
 Anant Nag as Jayasimharaja
 Urvashi as Vishalakshi Jayasimha
 Suman as Surya alias Gunnies East
 Sharath Lohithaswa as Naga alias Medda Naga South
 Ajay as Ajaya alias Adda Kasubi West
 Sanjjanaa Galrani as drunk Arjun's girlfriend
 Amit Tiwari as Rahul alias Mama North
 Sathyajith as Police Officer
 Bullet Prakash as Auto Driver
 Sadhu Kokila as Vegetable Buyer
 Kovai Sarala as Surya's wife
 Rekha Das as Vegetable Seller
 Shailaja Joshi as Kodan Rama's wife

Production
Darshan worked on this film simultaneously with Navagraha. He signed the film because the film's producer, Jayanna, had distributed Darshan's previous films.

Release 
The film released on the same day as Anthu Inthu Preethi Banthu.

Reception 
A critic from Sify gave the film a verdict of "average" and opined that "Darshan fans is sure to lap up this mass action masala". Vijayasarathy of Rediff gave the film a rating of two out of five stars and wrote that "Darshan does his usual act, but he is handicapped by the lack of a proper story".

Box office 
The film initially had high collections at the box office.

References

External links 

2000s Kannada-language films
2008 films
2008 action films